Metropol or Metropole may refer to:

Places
 Metropol (Berlin), a concert hall
 Metropole Cafe, a New York City jazz club
 Metropol Theater (disambiguation)
 Metropole, a tango jazz album by Artango
 Hotel Metropol (disambiguation), various hotels
 Minto Metropole, a building in Ottawa, Canada
 Metropolitan University College, a university college in Denmark whose native name is Professionshøjskolen Metropol

Music
 Metropol (album), 1997 album by UK group Lunatic Calm
 Metropole (album), a 2014 album by The Lawrence Arms
 Metropole, a 2006 album by Mike Barone Big Band
 Metropole Orkest, a jazz and pop orchestra based in the Netherlands

Other
 Metropole, the homeland or central territory of a colonial empire
 Esporte Clube Metropol, a Brazilian football team
 Metropol TV, a Norwegian television channel
 Metropol, a font designed by Aldo Novarese (1967)
 Metropole, the English name of 1970 Hungarian novel Epepe by Ferenc Karinthy

See also

 Metropolis (disambiguation)
 Metropolitan (disambiguation)
 Metro (disambiguation)